Copropraxia is a tic consisting of involuntarily performing obscene or forbidden gestures, or inappropriate touching. Copropraxia is a rare characteristic of Tourette syndrome. Related terms are coprolalia, referring to involuntary usage of profane words, and coprographia, making vulgar writings or drawings.

References

Symptoms and signs: Nervous system
Tourette syndrome